Hans Harald "Hasse" Zetterström was born 23 May 1877 in Stockholm, Sweden, to father August Zetterström and mother Elisabet Zetterström (née Carlberg). Hasse was a prominent author, columnist and editor. He died 1 June 1946.

Hasse was noted for his use of many writing pseudonyms. At the age of 20 he began working on the magazine Figaro and in 1897 started working at newspaper Söndags Nisse working in a variety of roles until becoming the editor of Söndags Nisse-Strix in 1924. As editor he commissioned the creation of the satirical magazine Grönköpings Veckoblad, detailing the fictional Swedish town of Grönköping. Hasse also began contributing a regular column in 1931 to major national Swedish newspaper Svenska Dagbladet.

Hasse married Anna Ahlberg in 1901 and became a father to Erik Zetterström (1904–1997) and Sven Zetterström (1902–1973). Erik became a notable journalist and columnist for Svenska Dagbladet under the pseudonym of Kar de Mumma whilst Sven was a screenwriter and journalist.

Novels 
Anna-Clara och hennes bröder 1917
Ljus
Något mildare
Se nästa sida!  
Samlade historier I-II 
Sex berättelser om julen 
Den lilla gåtan
Fattiga Riddare
Andersson, Oskar: Mannen som gör vad som faller honom in

References 

Händelser man minns – en krönika 1920–1969, fil. dr. Harald Schiller, 1970.
Sveriges befolkning 1890, Riksarkivet 2003
Nationalencyklopedin, 2007
Vem är det : Svensk biografisk handbok 1939, P A Norstedt & Söners Förlag, Stockholm 1939 s. 930

External links

 

1877 births
1946 deaths
Writers from Stockholm
Swedish male novelists
Swedish columnists
Swedish editors
Swedish satirists
20th-century Swedish novelists
Swedish magazine founders